Lovro Paparić (born August 5, 1999) is a Croatian professional water polo player. He is currently playing for VK Primorje. He is 6 ft 5 in (1.95 m) tall and weighs 260 lb (118 kg). He started playing waterpolo at the age of 6.

References

External links

 Hrvatski vaterpolski savez ǀ U-18 reprezentacija
 Paparić potpisao do 2022.!
 Paparić potpisao novi dvogodišnji ugovor s Primorjem EB
 Lovro Paparić potpisao novi ugovor, stožerni igrač mlade momčadi ostaje još dvije godine u Primorju
 Perspektivni centar Primorja nakon potpisa novoga ugovora: “Da sam otišao, to bih smatrao osobnim neuspjehom”
 Lovro Paparić potpisao na još 2 godine
 Lovro Paparić pozvan na pripreme reprezentacije, veliko priznanje mladom centru Primorja EB

1999 births
Living people
Croatian male water polo players